The Ministry of Drinking Water and Sanitation was a ministry of the Government of India formed in 2011. From May 2019, the ministry has been merged with the Ministry of Jal Shakti.

In 1999, the Department of Drinking Water Supply (DDWS) was formed under Ministry of Rural Development, for focused attention on drinking water and sanitation. Later it was renamed as Department of Drinking Water and Sanitation in 2010. In 2011, it was conferred the Ministry status, keeping in view the extreme importance given to the sector by the United Progressive Alliance government. The Ministry of Drinking Water and Sanitation was the nodal department for the overall policy, planning, funding and coordination of programmes of drinking water and sanitation in the country.

Responsibilities
The ministry was responsible for the implementation of Swachh Bharat Abhiyan in rural India. It got 8 million toilets constructed surpassing the target of 6 million toilets for the year 2015–16.

Notable decisions
The Ministry has requested various governmental departments to avoid the usage of plastic bottles to provide drinking water during governmental meetings etc., and instead, to make arrangements for providing drinking water that do not result in the generation of plastic waste.

Ministers

References

External links
Official website of the Ministry

Drinking Water and Sanitation
Water supply and sanitation in India
India